Thompson is an unincorporated community in Jefferson County, Nebraska, United States.

History
A post office was established at Thompson in the 1890s. The community was named for I. N. Thompson, the original owner of the town site.

References

Unincorporated communities in Jefferson County, Nebraska
Unincorporated communities in Nebraska